Curtis Guy Yarvin (born 1973), also known by the pen name Mencius Moldbug, is an American blogger, software engineer, and Internet entrepreneur. He is known, along with fellow theorist Nick Land, for founding the anti-egalitarian and anti-democratic philosophical movement known as the Dark Enlightenment or neoreactionary movement (NRx).

In his blog Unqualified Reservations, which he wrote from 2007 to 2014, and on his younger Substack page called Gray Mirror, which he started in 2020, he argues that American democracy is a failed experiment which should be replaced by an accountable monarchy, similar to the governance structure of corporations.  Yarvin has been described as a "neoreactionary" and "neo-monarchist" who "sees liberalism as creating a Matrix-like totalitarian system and who wants to replace American democracy with a sort of techno-monarchy".

In 2002, Yarvin launched the Urbit computer platform. In 2013, he co-founded the company Tlon to oversee the Urbit project, and helped lead it until 2019.

Biography

Early life and education 
Curtis Guy Yarvin was born in 1973 to an educated, liberal, secular family. His father is Herbert Yarvin. His grandparents on his father's side were Jewish American and communists. His father worked for the US government as a foreign service officer, and his mother was a Protestant from Westchester County. Yarvin spent part of his childhood abroad, mainly in Cyprus. In 1985, he returned to the US and entered Johns Hopkins' longitudinal Study of Mathematically Precocious Youth. He graduated from Brown University in 1992, then was a graduate student of a computer science PhD program at UC Berkeley, before dropping out after a year and a half to join a tech company.

In the 1980–1990s, Yarvin was influenced by the libertarian tech culture of the Silicon Valley. Yarvin read right-wing and American conservative works. The libertarian University of Tennessee law professor Glenn Reynolds introduced him to writers like Ludwig von Mises and Murray Rothbard. The rejection of empiricism by Mises and the Austrian School, who favored instead deduction from first principles, influenced Yarvin's mind-set.

Urbit 

In 2002, Yarvin founded the Urbit computer platform as a decentralized network of personal servers. In 2013 he co-founded the San Francisco-based company Tlön Corp to build out Urbit further with funding from Peter Thiel's venture capital arm, the Founders Fund. In 2016, Yarvin was invited to present on the functional programming aspects of Urbit at LambdaConf 2016, which resulted in the withdrawal of five speakers, two sub-conferences, and several sponsors. Yarvin left Tlon in January 2019, but retains some intellectual and financial involvement in the development of Urbit.

Neo-reactionary blogging 
Yarvin's reading of Thomas Carlyle convinced him that libertarianism was a doomed project without the inclusion of authoritarianism, and Hans-Hermann Hoppe's 2001 book Democracy: The God That Failed marked Yarvin's first break with democracy. Another influence was James Burnham, who asserted that real politics occurred through the actions of elites, beneath what he called apparent democratic or socialist rhetoric. In the 2000s, the failures of US-led nation building in Iraq and Afghanistan strengthened Yarvin's anti-democratic views, the federal response to the 2008 financial crisis strengthened his libertarian convictions, and Barack Obama's election as US president later that year reinforced his belief that history inevitably progresses toward left-leaning societies.

In 2007, Yarvin began the blog Unqualified Reservations to promote his political vision. He largely stopped updating his blog in 2013, when he began to focus on Urbit; in April 2016 he announced that Unqualified Reservations had "completed its mission".

Yarvin currently blogs about his political views on Substack under the page name Gray Mirror.

Views

Dark Enlightenment 

Yarvin believes that real political power in the United States is held by something he calls "the Cathedral", an amalgam of universities and the mainstream press. According to him, a so-called "Brahmin" social class dominates American society, preaching progressive values to the masses. Yarvin and the Dark Enlightenment (sometimes abbreviated to "NRx") movement assert that the cathedral's commitment to equality and justice erodes social order. Drawing on computer metaphors, Yarvin contends that society needs a "hard reset" or a "rebooting", not a series of gradual political reforms. Instead of activism, he advocates passivism, claiming that progressivism would fail without right-wing opposition. According to him, NRx adherents should rather design "new architectures of exit" than engage in ineffective political activism.

Yarvin argues for a "neo-cameralist" philosophy based on Frederick the Great of Prussia's cameralism. In Yarvin's view, democratic governments are inefficient and wasteful and should be replaced with sovereign joint-stock corporations whose "shareholders" (large owners) elect an executive with total power, but who must serve at their pleasure. The executive, unencumbered by liberal-democratic procedures, could rule efficiently much like a CEO-monarch. Yarvin admires Chinese leader Deng Xiaoping for his pragmatic and market-oriented authoritarianism, and the city-state of Singapore as an example of a successful authoritarian regime. He sees the US as soft on crime, dominated by economic and democratic delusions.

Yarvin supports authoritarianism on right-libertarian grounds, claiming that the division of political sovereignty expands the scope of the state, whereas strong governments with clear hierarchies remain minimal and narrowly focused. According to scholar Joshua Tait, "Moldbug imagines a radical libertarian utopia with maximum freedom in all things except politics." He has favored same-sex marriage, freedom of religion, private use of drugs, and written against race- or gender-based discriminatory laws, although, according to Tait, "he self-consciously proposed private welfare and prison reforms that resembled slavery". Tait describes Yarvin's writing as contradictory, saying: "He advocates hierarchy, yet deeply resents cultural elites. His political vision is futuristic and libertarian, yet expressed in the language of monarchy and reaction. He is irreligious and socially liberal on many issues but angrily anti-progressive. He presents himself as a thinker in search of truth but admits to lying to his readers, saturating his arguments with jokes and irony. These tensions indicate broader fissures among the online Right."

Under his Moldbug pseudonym, Yarvin gave a talk about "rebooting" the American government at the 2012 BIL Conference. He used it to advocate the acronym "RAGE", which he defined as "Retire All Government Employees". He described what he felt were flaws in the accepted "World War II mythology" alluding to the idea that Hitler's invasions were acts of self-defense. He argued these discrepancies were pushed by America's "ruling communists", who invented political correctness as an "extremely elaborate mechanism for persecuting racists and fascists". "If Americans want to change their government," he said, "they're going to have to get over their dictator phobia."

In the inaugural article published on Unqualified Reservations in 2007, entitled a formalist manifesto, Yarvin called his concept of aligning property rights with political power "formalism", that is the formal recognition of realities of the existing power, which should eventually be replaced in his views by a new ideology that rejects progressive doctrines transmitted by the cathedral. Yarvin's first use of the term 'neoreactionary' to describe his project occurred in 2008. His ideas have also been described by Dylan Matthews of Vox as "neo-monarchist".

Yarvin's ideas have been influential among right-libertarians and paleolibertarians, and the public discourses of prominent investors like Peter Thiel have echoed Yarvin's project of seceding from the US to establish tech-CEO dictatorships. Political strategist Steve Bannon has read and admired his work.

According to Tait, "Moldbug's relationship with the investor-entrepreneur Thiel is his most important connection." Thiel was an investor in Yarvin's startup Tlon and gave $100,000 to Tlon's co-founder John Burnham in 2011. In 2016, Yarvin privately asserted to Milo Yiannopoulos that he had been "coaching Thiel" and that he had watched the 2016 US election at Thiel's house. In his writings, Yarvin has pointed to a 2009 essay written by Thiel, in which the latter declared: "I no longer believe that freedom and democracy are compatible...  Since 1920, the vast increase in welfare beneficiaries and the extension of the franchise to women—two constituencies that are notoriously tough for libertarians—have rendered the notion of 'capitalist democracy' into an oxymoron."

Investor Balaji Srinivasan has also echoed Yarvin's ideas of techno-corporate cameralism. He advocated in a 2013 speech a "society run by Silicon Valley (...) an opt-in society, ultimately outside the US, run by technology."

Alt-right 
Yarvin has been described as part of the alt-right by journalists and commentators.  Journalist Mike Wendling has called Yarvin "the alt-right's favorite philosophy instructor". Tait describes Unqualified Reservations as a "'highbrow' predecessor and later companion to the transgressive anti-'politically correct' metapolitics of nebulous online communities like 4chan and /pol/." Yarvin has publicly distanced himself from the alt-right. In a private message, Yarvin counseled Milo Yiannopoulos, then a reporter at Breitbart News, to deal with neo-Nazis "the way some perfectly tailored high-communist NYT reporter handles a herd of greasy anarchist hippies. Patronizing contempt. Your heart is in the right place, young lady, now get a shower and shave those pits."

Writing in Vanity Fair, James Pogue said of Yarvin, "Some of Yarvin's writing from (his blog Unqualified Reservations) is so radically right wing that it almost has to be read to be believed, like the time he critiqued the attacks by the Norwegian far-right terrorist Anders Behring Breivik -- who killed 77 people, including dozens of children at a youth camp -- not on the grounds that terrorism is wrong but because the killings wouldn't do anything effective to overthrow what Yarvin called Norway's 'communist' government. He argued that Nelson Mandela, once head of the military wing of the African National Congress, had endorsed terror tactics and political murder against opponents, and said anyone who claimed 'St. Mandela' was more innocent than Breivik might have "a mother you'd like to fuck.'"

In Commonweal, Matt McManus said of Yarvin, "He comes across as a kind of third-rate authoritarian David Foster Wallace, combining post-postmodern bookish eclecticism with a yearning to communicate with and influence young disaffected white men. His writings are full of dubious historical claims usually mixed with thinly veiled bigotry and a powdery kind of middle-class snobbery.

Yarvin came to public attention in February 2017 when Politico magazine reported that Steve Bannon, who served as White House Chief Strategist under U.S. President Donald Trump, read Yarvin's blog and that Yarvin "has reportedly opened up a line to the White House, communicating with Bannon and his aides through an intermediary." The story was picked up by other magazines and newspapers, including The Atlantic, The Independent, and Mother Jones. Yarvin denied to Vox that he was in contact with Bannon in any way, though he jokingly told The Atlantic that his White House contact was the Twitter user Bronze Age Pervert. Yarvin later gave a copy of Bronze Age Pervert's book Bronze Age Mindset to Michael Anton, a former senior national security official in the Trump administration.

Views on race 

Yarvin has alleged that whites have higher IQs than blacks for genetic reasons. He has been described as a modern-day supporter of slavery, a description he disputes. He has claimed that some races are more suited to slavery than others. In a post that linked approvingly to Steve Sailer and Jared Taylor, he wrote: "It should be obvious that, although I am not a white nationalist, I am not exactly allergic to the stuff." In 2009, he wrote that since US civil rights programs were "applied to populations with recent hunter-gatherer ancestry and no great reputation for sturdy moral fiber", the result was "absolute human garbage."

Yarvin disputes accusations of racism, and in his essays, "Why I am not a White Nationalist" and "Why I am not an Anti-Semite," he offered a somewhat sympathetic analysis of those ideologies before ultimately rejecting them. He has also described the use of IQ tests to determine superiority as "creepy". Per Tait, "Moldbug's racial comments suggest a broader trend: the anonymity of the internet allows him and others who have followed in his wake to revel in taboo language, ideas, and activities. Violating social norms is a kind of liberation for Moldbug: entertaining these ideas is to break from the Cathedral."

See also

References

Sources

External links 

 Unqualified Reservations – Mencius Moldbug's blog
 Gray Mirror – Yarvin's Substack blog

1973 births
Living people
Alt-right writers
American conspiracy theorists
American male bloggers
American bloggers
American monarchists
American political commentators
American software engineers
Brown University alumni
Dark Enlightenment
Far-right politics in the United States
Johns Hopkins University alumni
Place of birth missing (living people)
Race and intelligence controversy
UC Berkeley College of Engineering alumni
21st-century American non-fiction writers
American atheists
21st-century pseudonymous writers